Pattabiramapuram is an attractive and clean town located 2.9 km east of Tiruttani, 80 km from Chennai, 34 km from Tiruvallur, and 66 km from Tirupathi. It is situated on the NH 205 (Chennai to Anantpur national highway).

Economy 
Pattabiramapuram is surrounded by Mel Vinayagapuram, Kel Vinayagapuram, Kasinathapuram, T-Puthur, Velancheri, and Methinipuram. The major economy of the town depends on Agriculture with 60% of the inhabitants having their own jasmine farms; Other crops include rice, sugar cane, peanuts (groundnuts), and vegetables.

Education 
Approximately 60% of the inhabitants of Pattabiramapuram have had some formal education. The town has facilities for higher education, with several educational institutions nearby, including Panchayat Union middle school, Thalapathy Matriculation school, and colleges including the G.R.T group of institutions and Arulmigu Subramaniya Swamy Government Art College, Tiruttani Polytechnic college.

Population statistics 
The 2001 Census  shows the total population of the town as 3362, with 1687 male and 1675  female. 50% of adult inhabitants are farmers, 25% are self-employed, and 25% are professionals. Commuters travel regularly to the nearby cities of Chennai, Kanchipuram, and Tiruvallur.

Facilities 
The town has good internal architecture such as cement roads, mains water and electricity, mobile communications towers, and a main Post Office. There is a recreation area with nearly 200 trees.

Local administration: Pattabiramapuram panchayat 

The Pattabiramapuram panchayat (local administration area) covers the following towns and villages:

 Pattabiramapuram
 Mel Vinayagapuram
 Kel vinayagapuram
 Pattabiramapuram Arunthathiyar colony
 Pattabiramapuram Irular colony
 Kasinathapuram
 Kasinathapuaram colony
 Teachers Nagar

The president of Pattabiramapuram as at October 2011 is Mr.S. Dhenan. This panchayat is connected with the Tiruttani Panchayat Union.

References

External links 
 Tiruttani

Villages in Tiruvallur district